Hatriot is an American thrash metal band formed in 2011 by former singer Steve "Zetro" Souza (Exodus) and guitarist Kosta Varvatakis. The band's current lineup includes Kosta V and Miguel Esparza on guitars, Souza's sons, Cody Souza on bass and vocals and Nick Souza on drums. They have been under contract with Massacre Records since 2012. Local San Francisco favorites they have made waves on the west coast with several tours. In summer of 2013 they played the Ernie Ball stage at Vans Warped tour. Later that year they performed at Eidenhoven Metal Meeting in Holland alongside Accept, Death Angel, Sabaton, Therion and many more. In 2015, Steve Souza announced he had stepped down as the front man of the band, due to his commitments to Exodus. His son Cody has since taken over lead vocals.

They released a four-song demo in 2011 and have since released four albums: Heroes of Origin (2013), Dawn of the New Centurion (2014), From Days unto Darkness (2019) and Vale of Shadows (2022).

Members

Current members
 Kosta Varvatakis – lead guitar, backing vocals (2011–present)
 Cody Souza – bass (2011–present), lead vocals (2015–present)
 Nick Souza – drums (2012–present)
 Miguel Esparza – lead guitar (2011–2013, 2022-present)

Former members
 Steve "Zetro" Souza – lead vocals (2011–2015)
 Drew Gage – rhythm guitar (2011)
 Kevin Paterson – rhythm guitar (2018–2022)
 Justin Sakogawa – rhythm guitar (2014–2017)
 Justin Cole – rhythm guitar (2013–2014, 2017–2018)
 Alex Bent – drums (2011–2012)

Discography

Albums and Demos
 2011: Hatriot (Demo)
 2013: Heroes of Origin
 2014: Dawn of the New Centurion
 2019: From Days unto Darkness
 2022: The Vale of Shadows

Singles
 2011 "Weapons of Class Destruction"
 2012 "Bloodstaind Wings"
 2013: "The Violent Times of My Dark Passenger"
 2013: "Murder American Style"
 2014: "Dawn of the New Centurion"
 2015: "From My Cold Dead Hands" (Cody Souza Version)
 2015: "The Fear Within" (Cody Souza Version)
 2016: "Carnival of Execution"
 2017: "Frankenstein Must Be Destroyed"
 2019: "Organic Remains"
 2019: "Ethereal Nightmare"
 2022: "Hymn For the Wicked"
 2022: "Verminous & Vile"
 2022: "Horns & Halos"

References

External links
 Official website
 

2011 establishments in California
Musical groups established in 2011
Musical groups from Oakland, California
Musical quartets
Thrash metal musical groups from California